Earle Wesley Albee, Sr. (March 17, 1898 – February 10, 1963) was an American politician and restaurant owner from Hallowell, Maine. Albee, a Republican from Portland, served in the Maine House of Representatives from 1949–54 and in the Maine Senate from 1955–56. During his time in office, Albee was a proponent of Maine adopting a sales tax.

He was sentenced in May 1957 for accepting money under the pretense of having a drunk driving charge dismissed. He was found guilty and sentenced to two to four years in prison. In May 1958, Albee's request for clemency was denied by Governor Edmund Muskie and the Executive Council.

He died in Pinellas County, Florida, aged 64.

References

1898 births
1963 deaths
People from Hallowell, Maine
Politicians from Portland, Maine
Republican Party members of the Maine House of Representatives
Republican Party Maine state senators
Maine politicians convicted of crimes
20th-century American politicians